Sarah Joseph may refer to:

 Sarah Joseph (author) (born 1946), Malayalam-language author from India
 Sarah Joseph (editor) (born 1971),former  CEO and editor of Muslim lifestyle magazine emel
 Sarah Joseph (legal academic), Australian human rights scholar